Memory Banda (born September 24, 1996) is a Malawian children's rights activist who has drawn international attention for her work in opposition to child marriage.

Early life 
Banda was born in Mzimba District and grew up in Chiradzulu District. Her father died when she was four years old, and she was raised by her mother. Despite growing in a singled-headed family, Memory defied the odds of early marriage in her community.  Her sister Mercy was forced to marry at the age of 11 after she became pregnant during an initiation ceremony. At a young age, Memory aspired to be different from everybody and everything. She acknowledges that she was a tough girl. She had a voice, even though her culture reminded her to be quiet and silent because she was a girl child. Her journey is an inspiration to the girl children across the globe.

Activism 
A 2014 Human Rights Watch report found that "one out of two girls in [Malawi] on average was married by her 18th birthday". Memory Banda has played an influential role at both community, national and recently international level, including presentation of a TED talk, speaking at the 59th United Nations Commission on the Status of Women, and at the Oslo Freedom Forum. She advocated for traditional leaders to formulate by-laws that protect the girl child and at national level she advocated for the legal age of marriage to be raised from 15 to 18 years of age. This led to the law being changed to recognize 18 years as the legal age of marriage in Malawi. But Memory is more concerned about the enforcement of the law and she continues to advocate for the girl-child empowerment. Memory has created Malawi’s Girls Empowerment Network (GENET) and Let Girls Lead girls community groups in an effort to keep girls in school and raise awareness of their rights. She collaborated on a story telling project were young girls shared their experiences, dreams and challenges they face through different forms of art and theater.

In 2021, she was featured in the French documentary film Bigger Than Us.

References 
1996 births
Child marriage
Children's rights activists
Living people
Malawian human rights activists
People from Mzimba District
Malawian women's rights activists